The 1972 European Women Basketball Championship, commonly called EuroBasket Women 1972, was the 13th regional championship held by FIBA Europe. The competition was held in Bulgaria.  won the gold medal and  the silver medal while  won the bronze.

First stage

Group A

Group B

Second stage

Championship Group

7th to 12th Group

Final ranking

External links 
 FIBA Europe profile
 Todor66 profile

1972
EuroBasket
International women's basketball competitions hosted by Bulgaria
EuroBasket Women
Euro